In the U.S. state of Pennsylvania, U.S. Routes are maintained by the Pennsylvania Department of Transportation (PennDOT). 


Mainline highways

Auxiliary routes

See also

References

 
U.S.